Theilman is an unincorporated community in Wabasha County, Minnesota, United States.

Geography  
Theilman is located within West Albany Township and Glasgow Township, at the junction of Wabasha County Roads 4 and 86. Theilman is located along the Zumbro River and near the center of Wabasha County.  It lies one mile southwest of the Zumbro Bottoms units of the Richard J. Dorer Memorial Hardwood State Forest.  Other nearby places include Kellogg, Plainview, Millville, Zumbro Falls, and Wabasha.

History
A post office called Theilmann was established in 1904, and remained in operation until 1996. The community was named for Christian Theilmann, the original owner of the town site.

References

Unincorporated communities in Minnesota
Unincorporated communities in Wabasha County, Minnesota
Rochester metropolitan area, Minnesota
Minnesota populated places on the Mississippi River